WhoCares, full title Ian Gillan & Tony Iommi: WhoCares, is a music project by Deep Purple frontman Ian Gillan and Black Sabbath guitarist Tony Iommi and a charity release by the supergroup WhoCares they had formed with the help of other musicians, to raise money to rebuild a music school in Gyumri, Armenia after the destruction of the city in the 1988 earthquake in Armenia.

In addition to Ian Gillan and Tony Iommi (who were Black Sabbath bandmates from 1983-1984), many artists took part in the charity music project including Jon Lord (Ian Gillan's former Deep Purple bandmate), ex-Metallica bassist Jason Newsted, Iron Maiden drummer Nicko McBrain, and HIM guitarist Mikko "Linde" Lindström.

In addition to the 2-track single "Out of My Mind / Holy Water" released in 2011, the 2-CD album contains in addition to previously recorded songs from various bands, rarities and unreleased material as well. The album was released on 13 July 2012 in Europe and in North America on 28 August 2012.

Jon Lord died three days after the album's release, making it his final recording.

Reception

Since its release, the album has been met with positive responses. Reviewer William Clark of Guitar International gave the album a positive review, saying "The wondrous contributions by Ronnie James Dio, Glenn Hughes, and by members of Metallica, Repo Depo, Iron Maiden, HIM, Deep Purple, and Black Sabbath should make nearly every hard rock and heavy metal fan weak at the knees!".

Track listing
CD 1

CD 2

Track-by-track personnel 
"Out of My Mind"

 Ian Gillan – vocals
 Tony Iommi – guitar
 Mikko "Linde" Lindström – guitar
 Jon Lord – keyboards
 Jason Newsted – bass
 Nicko McBrain – drums

"Zero the Hero" and "Trashed"

 Ian Gillan – vocals
 Tony Iommi – guitars, guitar effects, flute
 Geoff Nicholls – keyboards
 Geezer Butler – bass, bass effects
 Bill Ward – drums, percussion

"Get Away"

 Ian Gillan – vocals
 Michalis Rakintzis – instrumentation, arrangement

"Slip Away" and "Let It Down Easy"

 Tony Iommi – guitar
 Glenn Hughes – vocals, bass
 Bob Marlette – keyboards, bass
 Kenny Aronoff – drums

"Don't Hold Me Back"

 Ian Gillan – vocals
 Steve Morris – guitar
 Brett Bloomfield – bass
 Leonard Haze – drums

"She Think It's a Crime"

 Ian Gillan – vocals, harmonica
 Michael Lee Jackson – guitar
 Rodney Appleby – bass
 Howard Wilson – drums
 Steve Morris – guitar
 Joe Mennonna – saxophones
 Lance Anderson – Hammond organ
 Jesse O'Brien – keyboards
 Brownman Ali – flugelhorn
 Jaro Jarosil – cello
 The Gillanaires – backing vocals

"Easy Come, Easy Go"

 Ian Gillan – vocals
 Dean Howard – guitar
 Steve Morris – guitar
 Brett Bloomfield – bass
 Leonard Haze – drums

"Smoke on the Water"

 Ian Gillan – vocals
 Ronnie James Dio – vocals 
 Steve Morse – guitar
 Steve Morris – guitar
 Jon Lord – keyboards
 Roger Glover – bass
 Dave LaRue – bass
 Ian Paice – drums
 Van Romaine – drums
 Aitch McRobbie, Margo Buchanan, Pete Brown – backing vocals
 Annie Whitehead – trombone
 Paul Spong – trumpet, flugelhorn
 Roddy Lorimer – trumpet, flugelhorn
 Simon C. Clarke – baritone, alto sax, flute
 Tim Sanders – tenor sax, soprano sax

"Holy Water"

 Ian Gillan - vocals
 Tony Iommi - guitar
 Steve Morris - guitar
 Michael Lee Jackson - guitar
 Jesse O'Brien - keyboards
 Rodney Appleby - bass
 Randy Clarke - drums
 Arshak Sahakyan - dukuk
 Ara Gevorgyan - dukuk, keyboards

"Anno Mundi"

 Tony Martin – lead & backing vocals
 Tony Iommi – guitars
 Geoff Nicholls – keyboards
 Neil Murray – bass
 Cozy Powell – drums, percussion

"Hole In My Vest"

 Ian Gillan - vocals
 Steve Morris - guitar

"Can't Believe You Wanna Leave Me"

 Ian Gillan – vocals, harmonica
 Roger Glover – bass, keyboards, guitars, programming
 Ira Siegel, Nick Maroch – guitars
 Lloyd Landesman – keyboards
 Dr. John – piano
 Andy Newmark – drums
 George Young, Joe Mennonna – saxophones
 Randy Brecker – flugelhorn
 Vaneese Thomas, Christine Faith, Lydia Mann, Bette Sussmann – background vocals

"Can I Get a Witness"

 Ian Gillan – vocals, harmonica
 Gordon Fairminer – lead guitar
 Tony Tacon –  rhythm guitar
 Tony Whitfield – bass guitar
 Keith Roach – drums

"No Laughing In Heaven"

 Ian Gillan - vocals
 Steve Morris - guitar, keyboards
 Harry Shaw - guitar
 Mark Buckle - keyboards
 Keith Mulholland - bass
 Lou Rosenthal - drums

"When a Blind Man Cries"

 Ian Gillan - vocals
 Steve Morris - acoustic guitar

Charts

References

2012 compilation albums
WhoCares albums
Charity albums
Ian Gillan